Shannon Hamm is a death metal guitarist who played in Death from 1996 until their break-up in 2001. He then joined Chuck Schuldiner's second band Control Denied, which ended with the death of Schuldiner in 2001. Before Death, he was a locally well known guitarist in the Texas underground metal scene.  He was particularly good friends with "Dimebag" Darrell Abbott of Pantera and Damageplan. According to Abbott, Hamm "out shredded" Darrell in Pantera's glam metal days while Hamm was in a band named Metalstorm.

Shannon is almost always seen playing a Jackson Soloist guitar.

On December 12, 2007, Shannon Hamm played in a tribute show for the anniversary of Chuck Schuldiner's death. The show was organized by Quebec City metal promoters Capitale du Metal (English: Metal Capital, referring to Quebec City's active metal scene). Former Death guitarist Bobby Koelble and former Death bassist Scott Clendenin, along with Nicholas Barker, of Cradle of Filth and Dimmu Borgir fame, were also present at the show. Most of the guitar work and singing was performed by the members of Symbolic, a Death tribute band. The show was filmed and it is available on DVD.

On October 1, 2009, it was announced that Shannon Hamm had suffered a serious heart attack while at home and was hospitalized.

Discography
Death - The Sound of Perseverance (1998)
Control Denied - The Fragile Art of Existence (1999)

References

Death (metal band) members
American heavy metal guitarists
Living people
1967 births
20th-century American guitarists
Control Denied members